Howard Wilson Emmons (1912–1998) was an American professor in the department of Mechanical Engineering at Harvard University. During his career he conducted original research on fluid mechanics, combustion and fire safety. Today he is most widely known for his pioneering work in the field of fire safety engineering. He has been called "the father of modern fire science" for his contribution to the understanding of flame propagation and fire dynamics. He also helped design the first supersonic wind tunnel, identified a signature of the transition to turbulence in boundary layer flows (now known as "Emmons spots"), and was the first to observe compressor stall in a gas turbine compressor (still a major item of research today). He initiated studies on diffusion flames inside a boundary layer, and Emmons problem is named after him. He was eventually awarded the Timoshenko Medal by the American Society of Mechanical Engineers and the 1968 Sir Alfred Egerton Gold Medal from The Combustion Institute.

Upon Professor Emmons' death, Professor Patrick Pagni wrote, "It is not possible to properly summarize the magnitude of Professor Emmons' unique contributions to the establishment of fire safety science as a discipline, other than to call him  "Mr. Fire Research".

He continues to be remembered through the Emmons Lecture at International Symposium of The International Association for Fire Safety Science and the Howard W. Emmons Distinguished Scholar Endowment at Worcester Polytechnic Institute.

Biography
Born in Morristown, New Jersey on August 30, 1912.
Bachelor of Engineering in mechanical engineering from Stevens Institute of Technology in 1933.
Master of Engineering in mechanical engineering from Stevens Institute of Technology in 1935.
Doctor of Science in mechanical engineering for Harvard University in 1938.
 Advisors were John Finnie Downie Smith and Charles Harold Berry.
Worked briefly for Westinghouse and the University of Pennsylvania.
Professor at Harvard from 1940 onwards.
 Notable student was Richard Ernest Kronauer, who later became an expert on human circadian rhythms.
US National Academy of Engineering member in 1965.
US National Academy of Sciences member in 1966.
Wife Dorothy
Children Beverly, Scott, and Keith
Died November 20, 1998

Awards and honors
 American Physical Society Fellow, elected 1946
Honorary ScD from Stevens Institute of Technology, 1963
US National Academy of Engineering member, 1965
US National Academy of Sciences member, 1966
Egerton Gold Medal from the Combustion Institute, 1968
100th Anniversary Medal from Stevens Institute of Technology, 1970
Timoshenko Medal from ASME, 1971
Stevens Honor Award Medallion from Stevens Institute of Technology, 1970
Named Fire Protection Man of the Year by the Society of Fire Protection Engineers, 1982
Office of Naval Research Prize from the American Physical Society, 1982
Fluid Dynamics Prize (APS), 1982 
Arthur B. Guise Medal by the Society of Fire Protection Engineers, 1986

Selected publications

Sole Author

The Drop Condensation of Vapors
Harvard University Thesis (S.D.), 1938.

Gas dynamics tables for air
Dover: New York, NY, 1947.

Fundamentals of Gas Dynamics
Princeton University Press: Princeton NJ, 1958.

Fluid mechanics and combustion
Proceedings of the 13th International Symposium on Combustion, p. 1-18
Pittsburgh, Pa., Combustion Institute, 1971.

“The Further History of Fire Science” Combustion Science and Technology, 40,
1984 (reprinted in Fire Technology, 21(3), 1985 )

Joint

Thermodynamic properties of helium to 50.000°K
by Wilbert James Lick, Howard Wilson Emmons
Harvard University Press: Cambridge, MA, 1962.

Transport properties of helium from 200 to 50.000°K
by Wilbert James Lick, Howard Wilson Emmons
Harvard University Press: Cambridge, MA, 1965.

The fire whirl
by Howard W. Emmons and Shuh-Jing Ying
Proceedings of the 11th International Symposium on Combustion, p. 475-486
Pittsburgh, Pa., Combustion Institute, 1967.

See also
Howard W Emmons, Memorial Tributes: National Academy of Engineering, Volume 10 (2002) National Academy of Engineering 
TV show where Howard Emmons speaks of the 1980 MGM Las Vegas fire and of the fire code Harvard 
The Web of Mechanicians
Howard W. Emmons Papers at WPI

Notes

References
 Howard W. Emmons, Authority on Fire Safety, Dies at 86, Harvard University Gazette (Dec 3 1998).
Kronauer, Land, Stone, and Abernathy,  Howard Wilson Emmons, Faculty of Arts and Sciences - Memorial Minute, Harvard University Gazette (March 1, 2007).
Bryner, S.L., ed. "Symposium in Memory of Professor Howard Emmons", Fifteenth Meeting of the UJNR Panel on Fire Safety, Volume 2, March 2000.
Land, R.I. and Trefethen, L.M. "A Tribute To Howard Wilson Emmons, 1912–1998", Journal of Fluids Engineering 121(2), p. 234-235 (June 1999).
Beyler, Craig. "Guest Editorial: Professor Howard Emmons 1912-1998", Fire Technology 35(1), p. 1 (Feb 1999).

External links
 

1912 births
1998 deaths
People from Morristown, New Jersey
Harvard School of Engineering and Applied Sciences alumni
Stevens Institute of Technology alumni
University of Pennsylvania faculty
20th-century American physicists
Members of the United States National Academy of Sciences
Harvard University faculty
Thermodynamicists
Members of the United States National Academy of Engineering
Fellows of the American Physical Society